Ahsan Habib Khan is a Bangladeshi retired Bangladesh Army Brigadier General and one of the four incumbent Election Commissioners of Bangladesh. After retired from Army he served as vice-chairman of The Bangladesh Telecommunication Regulatory Commission (BTRC).

Career 
Khan retired from Bangladesh Army in 2013 with the rank of Brigadier General. During his military career, he served as the Director General of the Spectrum Division of the Bangladesh Telecommunication Regulatory Commission.

From 2014 to 2017, Khan was the Vice-Chairperson of Bangladesh Telecommunication Regulatory Commission. During his tenure the Bangladesh Telecommunication Regulatory Commission cracked down on usage of illegally imported cell phones.

Bangladesh Tariqat Federation proposed his name to selection committee for the Election Commission. On 26 February 2022, Khan was appointed an Election Commissioner.

References 

Living people
Bangladesh Army brigadiers
Election Commissioners of Bangladesh
Year of birth missing (living people)